is a 1954 Japanese film directed by Kenji Mizoguchi. It was adapted from Monzaemon Chikamatsu's 1715 bunraku play Daikyōji Mukashi Goyomi. The film was presented at the 1955 Cannes Film Festival,

Plot
Mohei is an apprentice to Ishun, the wealthy grand scroll-maker of Kyoto. Ishun makes nightly sexual forays into the maid Otama's room, but she resists his advances, despite offers of goods and property, claiming to be engaged to Mohei. Mohei refuses to go along with the deception and tells Otama to accept the rape because they are both there to serve the household. As two adulterers are paraded through the streets on their way to be crucified, Mohei proclaims that they should not have betrayed morality.

When Ishun's brother-in-law asks for a loan, Ishun's wife Osan, knowing Ishun will refuse, seeks help from Mohei. Mohei begins forging a receipt attempting to obtain a loan in Ishun's name, but is caught. Ishun threatens to summon the authorities, but Otama asks him to forgive them, claiming that it was she that had asked for the money. Ishun uses the opportunity to blackmail Otama to get rid of a romantic rival and unwanted employee. Ishun orders Mohei imprisoned and brought up on charges in the morning.

When Osan thanks Otama for trying to help, Otama informs her of Ishun's behavior. Hoping to confront him, Osan switches rooms with Otama for the night. To her surprise, Mohei, who has escaped, sneaks into the room to thank Otama before fleeing. Osan attempts to persuade Mohei into staying but the two are interrupted by Sukeyemon, the head clerk, who, having learned of Mohei's escape and attempting to alert the head of the household, had uncovered Otama instead.

Mohei is chased away, and Ishun encourages his wife to commit suicide to protect his name. Osan flees the house only to again encounter Mohei. They later discover that Ishun has alerted the police. However, Mohei is only charged for forgery, rather than adultery, as Ishun is more concerned with their own reputation. Osan and Mohei decide to commit suicide together. They change their minds when Mohei professes his love for Osan.

They continue to flee on foot, having momentarily convinced Ishun that the suicide had been successful. Ishun sends Sukeyemon to recover the bodies and bring Osan's back so they can continue covering up the adultery. Unfortunately, a traveling chestnut salesman notifies Ishun's house of the whereabouts of the two lovers. Osan and Mohei reach the home of Mohei's father where he reluctantly feeds and shelters them. Ishun's men arrive and browbeat Mohei's father into giving them up. Mohei is bound and left for the police to find the next day while Osan is taken to her family home in route to Ishun.

Isan, a rival scroll maker, conspires with Sukeyemon to reveal Ishun's deception. While Osan refuses to return to Ishun's house, Mohei arrives at her family home, having been freed by his father. Osan's brother sneaks off to fetch Ishun and his men while their mother tries to convince Mohei to turn himself in. Just as Ishun's men arrives, the lovers escape one last time. They are captured by the police and confess to adultery.

The Shogunate Deputy erects a public notice declaring Ishun guilty of deceiving the authorities and is therefore banished from town, his property and wealth confiscated. While the servants are packing to search for new employment, they talk about Sukeyemon also being banished for his failures in not only keeping a better eye on the property, but also not reporting Ishun's negligence in his refusal to report the affair. Soon the servants hear another parade going on and head outside. The servants see Osan and Mohei holding hands as they are being ridden on horseback on their way to crucifixion and death. The other servants watch the parade and note that Mohei and Osan look happier than ever before.

Cast
 Kazuo Hasegawa as Mohei
 Kyōko Kagawa as Osan
 Eitarō Shindō as Ishun
 Eitarō Ozawa as Sukeyemon
 Yōko Minamida as Otama
 Haruo Tanaka as Gifuya Dōki
 Chieko Naniwa as Okō
 Ichirō Sugai as Genbei
 Tatsuya Ishiguro as Isan
 Hiroshi Mizuno as Kuroki
 Hisao Tōake as Morinokoji
 Ikkei Tamaki as Jūshirō Umegaki
 Kimiko Tachibana as Umetatsu Akamatsu
 Keiko Koyanagi as Okaya
 Sayako Nakagami as Osono

Awards
 1954 Blue Ribbon Award for Best Director for Kenji Mizoguchi

Legacy
In 2017, a 4K digitally restored version of the film was presented at the Venice Film Festival and the Kyoto Historica International Film Festival.

References

External links
 
 
 
 
 

1954 films
1954 drama films
Films scored by Fumio Hayasaka
Films directed by Kenji Mizoguchi
Films produced by Masaichi Nagata
Films set in Kyoto
Japanese black-and-white films
Jidaigeki films
Films with screenplays by Yoshikata Yoda
Films with screenplays by Matsutarō Kawaguchi
Japanese films based on plays
Daiei Film films
Japanese drama films
1950s Japanese films